The Hospital Saturday News was published during 1930 for the Blue Mountains District Anzac Memorial Hospital Board by Charles Lawson Dash.

History
Printed by Joseph Bennett and published for the Blue Mountains District Anzac Memorial Hospital Board by Charles Lawson Dash of Leura, this paper circulated throughout the Blue Mountains. When it began and when it ceased is unknown.

Digitisation
The Hospital Saturday News has been digitised as part of the Australian Newspapers Digitisation Program project of the National Library of Australia.

See also
List of newspapers in New South Wales
List of newspapers in Australia

References

External links
 

Defunct newspapers published in New South Wales
Newspapers on Trove